Wanning or in local Hainanese dialect as Ban Ning is a county-level city in the southeast of Hainan Province, China. Although called a "city", Wanning refers to both the county seat and to the entire county as a whole. The county-wide area has an estimated population of 65,871 (2006).

History
Wanning first got its current name during the Southern Song Dynasty, after being renamed from Wan'an. Wanning was later renamed back to Wan'an again in 1143 until its name was changed to Wanzhou in 1370, but subsequently reverted to its present name after the Communist takeover in the 1950s. It was promoted from a county to a city on August 5, 1996.

Economy
Tourism plays a vital role in the city. Famous for its tropical scenery, Wanning proper lies approximately half an hour's drive from the beach and has several five-star hotels. The city of Wanning produces coffee, black pepper, rubber, rice, bananas, and sugarcane.

Transportation 
Wanning is served by the Wanning Railway Station, part of the Hainan East Ring Intercity Rail.

Climate
Wanning is hot most of the year.  At times it can become cold with temperatures between 5 and 8 degrees Celsius.

References

Cities in Hainan